A status referendum was held on the island of Sint Eustatius on 8 April 2005.

Background
After the 1994 referendum came out in favour of maintaining and restructuring the Netherlands Antilles, the government of the Netherlands Antilles tried to restructure the Netherlands Antilles and attempted to forge closer ties between the islands, as is exemplified by the adoption of an anthem of the Netherlands Antilles in 2000. A new referendum on Sint Maarten, which was in favour of a separate status for Sint Maarten as a country within the Kingdom of the Netherlands, sparked a new series of referendums across the Netherlands Antilles, however.

Sint Eustatius was the only island to again vote for retaining the Netherlands Antilles. However, since none of the other islands chose to remain part of the Netherlands Antilles, the Sint Eustatius island council opted for direct ties with the Netherlands.

Result

See also
Dissolution of the Netherlands Antilles
2000 Sint Maarten status referendum
2004 Bonaire status referendum
2004 Saban status referendum
2005 Curaçao status referendum

Notes

Referendums in Sint Eustatius
Referendums in the Netherlands Antilles
2005 referendums
2005 in the Netherlands Antilles
April 2005 events in North America
Sint Eustatius